Aleksandra Mróz (23 June 1935 – 5 July 2015) was a Polish swimmer. She competed in the women's 200 metre breaststroke at the 1952 Summer Olympics.

References

External links
 

1935 births
2015 deaths
Polish female breaststroke swimmers
Olympic swimmers of Poland
Swimmers at the 1952 Summer Olympics
Sportspeople from Bydgoszcz